These are the 1967 Five Nations Championship squads:

England

 John Barton
 Mike Coulman
 John Finlan
 Bob Hearn
 Roger Hosen
 Christopher Jennins
 Phil Judd (c.)
 Colin McFadyean
 John Pallant
 Roger Pickering
 Stephan Richards
 Budge Rogers
 Dave Rollitt
 Keith Savage
 Bob Taylor
 Dave Watt

France

Head coach: Jean Prat

 Michel Arnaudet
 Jean-Claude Berejnoi
 Jean-Michel Cabanier
 Guy Camberabero
 Lilian Camberabero
 Christian Carrère
 Elie Cester
 Benoît Dauga
 Christian Darrouy (c.)
 Claude Dourthe
 Bernard Duprat
 Jacques Fort
 Jean Gachassin
 Arnaldo Gruarin
 André Herrero
 Claude Lacaze
 Jean-Claude Lasserre
 Jean-Pierre Lux
 Jo Maso
 Jean Salut
 Michel Sitjar
 Walter Spanghero

Ireland

 Barry Bresnihan
 Niall Brophy
 Mick Doyle
 Alan Duggan
 Mike Gibson
 Ken Goodall
 Sam Hutton
 Ken Kennedy
 Tom Kiernan
 Sean MacHale
 Willie John McBride
 Mick Molloy
 Al Moroney
 Noel Murphy (c.)
 Philo O'Callaghan
 Robert Scott
 Brendan Sherry
 Jerry Walsh
 Roger Young

Scotland

 Alasdair Boyle
 Sandy Carmichael
 David Chisholm
 Pringle Fisher (c.)
 Derrick Grant
 Alec Hastie
 Sandy Hinshelwood
 Billy Hunter
 Frank Laidlaw
 Ian Laughland
 John Macdonald
 Ian McCrae
 David Rollo
 Brian Simmers
 Peter Stagg
 Jim Telfer
 Jock Turner
 Rob Welsh
 David Whyte
 Stewart Wilson

Wales

 Dewi Bebb
 Ken Braddock
 Gerald Davies
 Gareth Edwards
 Norman Gale
 Grahame Hodgson
 Billy Hullin
 Keith Jarrett
 Barry John
 Ron Jones
 Allan Lewis
 John Lloyd
 Billy Mainwaring
 Dai Morris
 John O'Shea
 Alun Pask (c.)
 Brian Price
 Terry Price
 Billy Raybould
 Brian Rees
 John Taylor
 David Watkins (c.)
 Stuart Watkins
 Denzil Williams

References

External links
1967 Five Nations Championship at ESPN

Six Nations Championship squads